Mahendra Mohan Choudhury (12 April 1908 – 27 December 1982) was a freedom fighter and politician from Nagaon, Undivided Kamrup district (now Barpeta district) of Western Assam. He was Chief Minister of Assam from 1970 to 1972. He also served as governor of Punjab.

Early life
Mahendra Mohan Choudhury was born on 12 April 1908 in Nagaon, Undivided Kamrup district in an Assamese family. He did his graduation in Arts and subsequently completed his Bachelor of Laws.

Politics
A great persona and a true Gandhian, he fought for the independence of India during freedom movement and went to jail thrice in 1932, 1941 and in 1945 respectively. He was a member of Assam Vidhan Sabha (1946–1952), Parliamentary Secretary (1947), State Minister (1951, 1955), President of Assam Congress Committee, President of Assam Vidhan Sabha (1967), Speaker of the Assam Legislative Assembly (1959-1967), Cabinet Minister (1967–1970), Chief Minister of Assam (1970–1972) and Governor of Punjab.

Works
He wrote books, viz. Mahatma Gandhi and The Philosophy of Binova Bhabe. He was associated with many socio-religious institutions like Sankardev-Kristi Vikash Samiti, Gita Samaj, Madhupur Satra etc. 
Mahendra Mohan Choudhury was also instrumental in founding the Saint Sankaradeva Chair at Punjabi University, Patiala, Punjab, which had contributed immensely in acquainting the pan-Indian community of scholars with the Life and Works of the Saint.

Personal life and death 
Choudhury had a son, Sourindra Mohan Choudhury.

Mahendra Mohan Choudhury died in Gauhati Medical College and Hospital following a heart attack on 27 December 1982. Mahendra Mohan Choudhury had six children, 2 sons and four daughters.

See also 
 Chhatbir Zoo, named after Mahendra Mohan Choudhry

References 

People from Barpeta district
Kamrupi people
1982 deaths
Indian independence activists from Assam
Governors of Punjab, India
Chief Ministers of Assam
1908 births
Speakers of the Assam Legislative Assembly
Chief ministers from Indian National Congress
Assamese people